AfriLabs is a pan-African network organisation of over 300 innovation centers across 50 African countries. Each hub serves as a meeting point for entrepreneurs, technologists, investors, tech companies and web/mobile engineers in its community. AfriLabs provides a network for technology and innovation centers across Africa to network, collaborate and share knowledge.

History 
AfriLabs was founded in 2011 to build a community around the rapidly emerging tech hubs in Africa. AfriLabs was founded with five hubs: Nailab Kenya, iHub Kenya, HiveColab Uganda, ActivSpaces Cameroun and Banta Labs Senegal. The first gathering of AfriLabs took place at the launching of iHub. In 2012, AfriLabs was formally registered in the Netherlands as a foundation and hired its first Executive Director in November. AfriLabs also partnered with Indigo Trust and Hivos. In 2013, AfriLabs laid out strategic priorities and went into partnership with Microsoft 4Afrika and the Rockefeller Foundation. AfriLabs also got involved with the World Bank InfoDev's virtual incubation project and added 5 more hubs to its network from East Africa.

In 2014, AfriLabs had its second global meetup in Berlin. AfriLabs also collaborated with The Rockefeller Foundation to launch a digital jobs challenge. AfriLabs launched its 1st Collaboration Challenge with support from Microsoft4Afrika and initiated the hub sustainability challenge with AfriHive. In 2015, AfriLabs had its first African meetup in Egypt. OSIWA carried out an assessment in partnership with the organization to explore hubs as creative spaces. AfriLabs hosted a sustainability workshop, 'Hub in a Box'. While the official AfriLabs website was created, branding was carried out. AfriLabs launched social media takeovers for members and launched capacity building partnership with MBA programs.

In 2016, AfriLabs transitioned its secretariat assets to Abuja, registered as a non-profit  in Nigeria, expanded the administrative team- secretariat, launched its corporate affiliate program with Africa.com and Facebook, and went into partnership with Making All Voices Count (MAVC) which resulted in the AfriLabs Annual Gathering, organizational support, the development of a virtual learning platform and regional Hub City meet ups in Dakar, Johannesburg, Cairo, Lagos and Nairobi. The first African Annual Gathering took place in Accra, Ghana.

In 2018, AfriLabs held its first Virtual Board Election and elected new board members into the team. In 2018, AfriLabs, in collaboration with Microsoft, hosted a free technical training for startups and entrepreneurs in Lagos, Nigeria. In the same year, AfriLabs and ICT4SI partnered to host their first West African social innovation workshop in Abuja, Nigeria. In August, AfriLabs hosted its first Hubs Learning Week which was sponsored by MAVC. In October, The Annual Gathering took place in Cairo, Egypt hosted by the District and co-organized by Hivos and AfriLabs. In November, TNE in collaboration with AfriLabs organized the Supersize the Valley Conference themed "Changing the Paradigm: From Individual to Ecosystem".

Board members 
The current Board Chair is now Moetaz Helmy from Egypt and founder of KMT House, Cairo. He replaced Rebecca Enonchong who served from 2017-2021.

2017-2021

Rebecca Enonchong (Board Chair), Moetaz Helmy (Board Secretary), Kudzai Mubaiwa (Board Treasurer), Fatoumata Niang Niox (Francophone Representative), Takunda Chingonzo, Daniel Chinagozi and Linda Kwamboka (Board members).

2021 -

Moetaz Helmy (Board Chair), Linda Kwamboka (Board Secretary), Kudzai Mubaiwa (Board Treasurer), Elodie Nonga (Francophone Representative), Takunda Chingonzo, Daniel Chinagozi and Steve Tchoumba (Board members).

Advisory board 
AfriLabs's advisory board consists of Michael Oluwagbemi (founder of LoftyInc Allied Partner) and Seye Bassir (Director of Investment at IFU).

Operations 

 Connecting hubs, collaboration.
 Creating platforms for members to communicate, share knowledge and collaborate.
 Capacity building of hub managers and start-ups.
 Crowd source community knowledge.
 Disseminating important information, best practices with hub trends local and international through newsletters, press releases and social media.
 Engaging stakeholders: Tech Hubs, Investors (Angel and Venture Capitalists), Government, Developmental and Corporate organizations.
 Creating linkages within the African ecosystem.

AfriLabs Capacity Building Programme 
In 2019, AfriLabs announced the launch of its AfriLabs Capacity Building Programme (ACBP). The ACBP is a 36-month intensive capacity initiative designed by AfriLabs for African tech hubs to improve their capacity to support the growing number of startups and MSMEs in their communities across Africa. It is supported by €2 million from the French Development Agency (AFD) through the Digital Africa seed fund. It aims to train hub managers and staff with African-tailored content, models and best practices for hub management and startup support. The programme's goal is to build investable startups across Africa. The AfriLabs Capacity Building Programme (ACBP) is an intensive capacity building programme for hubs. This project is being carried out thanks to AFD's support through the Digital Africa seed fund. This includes:

 30 physical workshops in 15 convening African cities.
 12 Quarterly Hubs Learning Weeks - a series of peer-to-peer virtual capacity building webinars
 Full hub management certification course in partnership with a major African university
 Hubs-in-Residence at AfriLabs Annual Gathering 2020 and 2021
 Toolkits on business development and investment management
 SDG meetup grants (€2,000 per selected hub)
 Capacity Building Awards (€15,000 per selected hub)
 Travel sponsorship for hubs in-residence program, physical workshops, etc.

Capacity Building Awards 
The Capacity Building Awards is an initiative within the Capacity Building Program that provides a grant of €15,000 to winning hubs within the AfriLabs network to implement projects for the hubs and startups within their network, showcasing the application of capacity building models.

During AfriLabs's virtual 2020 Annual Gathering held from 12–14 October 2020, 17 innovation hubs were rewarded with 15,000€ each to implement startup support projects across Africa. Winners were selected from a pool of over 60 applications from every region in Africa. Some of the successful applications are collaborations between hubs in different countries and regions.

Ingenious City, Democratic Republic of Congo and a cross-regional collaboration effort from Roar Nigeria Hub, Nigeria and Centre d’Innovation de Lubumbashi (CINOLU) won for their projects on virtual incubation.

Under the women support category, Douar Tech (Morocco), Makerere Innovation and Incubation Centre (Uganda), Hive Colab (Uganda), Wennovation Hub (Nigeria) and DoniLab (Mali) won while Eldo Hub (Kenya), Maio Business Centre (Cabo Verde), TechQuest STEM Academy (Nigeria) and Junub open space collaboration projects were also successful.

For Investor & Mentor Networks Building and Matching category, a regional collaboration between Jacaranda Hub (Zambia) and GoDo Hub (Nigeria) won, as well as Ennovate Hub (Tanzania). ActivSpaces (Cameroon) and Recycle Up! (Ghana) won for their projects on innovative and practical methods of training start-ups within their network on financial management, communications and marketing. Meanwhile, Clean Technology Hub Abuja (Nigeria), Habaka Hub (Madagascar) and Tarkwa Entrepreneurship Development Hub (Ghana) were awarded 2,000 Euros each to host virtual meetups on COVID-19 and the SDGs.

AfriLabs Hubs Learning Week and Virtual Meetup Grants  
AfriLabs Hubs Learning Week was launched in August 2017, consisting of five virtual workshops on capacity building in the form of webinars for hub managers. The Hubs Learning Week in 2017 was part of the Manjaro Virtual Learning Platform Initiative sponsored by Making All Voices Count (MAVC).

From 2020, the AfriLabs Hubs Learning Week is now being powered by the AfriLabs Capacity Building Programme. It is now a series of virtual capacity building workshops that focus largely on practical case studies and strategies that work and bring together hub managers and staff from across Africa to engage each other on the skills needed to operate and accelerate African hubs.

The Virtual Meetup Grant is a part of the AfriLabs Hubs Learning Week.

Physical Workshops 
The Physical Workshop is a training workshop where content of the AfriLabs Capacity Building curriculum will be delivered physically in cities across Africa. Each selected city will serve as a convening point for participating hubs within the city as well as from surrounding cities and countries. The workshops will focus on highly interactive, practical and one-on-one mentorship sessions from established business owners in the local city. The workshops will be delivered in partnership with African Business Angel Network (ABAN) and Afric’Innov (Bond’Innov) in English and French.

AfriLabs Annual Gathering 
The AfriLabs Annual Gathering is AfriLabs’ flagship event, which provides a unique opportunity for tech hubs within the AfriLabs network and other stakeholders of the African technology and innovation ecosystem (such as corporations, development agencies, academics, and investors) to convene and network.

The 2021 AfriLabs Annual Gathering marks AfriLabs's 10th anniversary. The event aims to celebrate and reflect on this milestone and what the future holds for innovation in Africa. The gathering was themed “AfriLabs at 10: A Decade of Empowering and Inspiring Innovation across Africa”, illuminating AfriLabs's growth and impact on the development of the African innovation ecosystem. The event was held in Abuja, Nigeria, from the 27th to 29 October 2021. The 6th edition of the AfriLabs Annual Gathering aims at fostering interpersonal relationships between different stakeholders which will lead to the emergence of new partnerships and continued development of the African continent. 

The event celebrates and reflects on the strides of the Innovation Ecosystem in Africa. AfriLabs's selection of the theme is a reflection of their impact in empowering hubs and driving innovation across the continent.

AfriLabs is excited to announce that they are partnering with Deutsche Gesellschaft für Internationale Zusammenarbeit (GIZ) GmbH to support local networks of innovation hubs in Africa. The partnership with the GIZ project Make-IT in Africa supports the organisational development of local tech hub networks and associations, as well as strengthens the connection between tech hub networks and AfriLabs through a series of strategic discussions before and during the 2021 AfriLabs Annual Gathering in Nigeria.

State of the Africa’s Tech Hubs Ecosystem report 
Even though Africa's tech hubs have grown to a new record of 643 across the continent, some 25% of them only provide co-working spaces, presenting an opportunity for greater growth, according to a new survey. The research by Briter Bridges and AfriLabs is some of the most detailed about the tech hub ecosystem, and explores how the hubs finance themselves, offer startups.

Briter Bridges founder Dario Giuliani, a co-author of the report, tells The Africa Report: “I have always thought we have been gauging hubs’ work with the wrong scale. Hubs have been playing a catalyst role across Africa’s cities that transcends the mere act of supporting start-ups. Although several such organisations still offer only co-working facilities, an often understated role these hubs play is that of safe havens for the youth in otherwise poorly conducive environments, as well as forward-looking training centres promoting digital literacy.”

In 2021, during the AfriLabs Annual Gathering in Abuja, AfriLabs and Briter Bridges released a second edition of the report titled Bolstering Innovation in Africa. At least 1031 innovation hubs were identified as operational across Africa as of October 2021, using a combination of primary and secondary data collection methods, in an effort that has seen hundreds of hub managers involved, from Dakar to Cairo and Maputo. In this study, hubs are defined as support structures that offer services including incubation and acceleration programmes, co-working spaces and support structures to enable entrepreneurs to thrive.

Mozilla and AfriLabs partner to explore impactful technological ideas in Africa 
In 2020, Mozilla and AfriLabs partnered to convene a series of roundtable discussions with African startups, entrepreneurs, developers and innovators to better understand the tech ecosystem and identify new product ideas to spur the next generation of open innovation. This strategic partnership will help develop more relevant, sustainable support for African innovators and entrepreneurs to build scalable resilient products while leveraging honest and candid discussions to identify areas of common interest. There is no shortage of innovators, creative talents, and diverse stakeholders across Africa coming together to solve social, economic problems unique to the continent.

Building a resilient innovative Africa 
Djembe Consultants officially launched an Insights report in collaboration with AfriLabs as part of the AfriLabs Annual Gathering 2020. The report surveyed over 1,000 pan-African innovators and features the unique perspectives of some of the continent’s most experienced and informed social and economic experts and commentators.

Catalytic Africa 
AfriLabs, in collaboration with African Business Angels Network (ABAN), launched Catalytic Africa, a co-matching fund designed for African startups, at the AfriLabs Annual Gathering held on Thursday, October 28, 2021.

Catalytic Africa is an investment tool that aims to increase the pool of capital available to promising African growth-stage entrepreneurs, support the startup ecosystem, and increase the visibility of impact to institutional funders. The co-matching investment is designed to fund African startups with innovative digital solutions and measurable impact, increase the investments made by angel investors in African start-ups, present reliable ecosystem data and insights to impact reporting for all stakeholders and ultimately strengthen African angel networks and innovation hubs.

References 

Scientific organizations based in Africa